Atherfield is a rural location in the south west of the Isle of Wight, UK. It includes the small settlements of Atherfield Green and Little Atherfield, as well as several farms, and is set in largely open farmland. To the south west it is bounded by the cliffs of Chale Bay and Brighstone Bay, which are divided by Atherfield Point. The south-eastern part of Brighstone Bay is also sometimes known as Atherfield Bay, and was the site of a former holiday camp, now demolished.

Geology

Atherfield Bay is one of the best sources of Cretaceous fossils, and is one of the places that gives the Wight the nickname "Dinosaur Isle" (see Dinosaurs of the Isle of Wight). The unique land formation on this coast means fossils up to 30 million years old are uncovered.

The bay also marks the landward edge of the Atherfield Ledge, an underwater outcrop that has claimed many ships including the SS Eider and more.

References

Populated places on the Isle of Wight